Joaquim José Gusmão dos Reis Martins is an East Timorese politician. He is the incumbent Secretary of State for Civil Protection, serving since June 2020 under the VIII Constitutional Government of East Timor led by Taur Matan Ruak. Previously, from 2018 to 2020, he was Minister of Agriculture and Fisheries in the same government.

References

External links 

 

Government ministers of East Timor
Independent politicians in East Timor
Living people
Year of birth missing (living people)

21st-century East Timorese politicians